Verduno is a comune (municipality) in the Province of Cuneo in the Italian region Piedmont, located about  southeast of Turin and about  northeast of Cuneo.

Verduno borders the following municipalities: Bra, La Morra, Roddi, and Santa Vittoria d'Alba.

Demographic evolution

References

Cities and towns in Piedmont